Mohd Ramli bin Md Kari is a Malaysian politician who was the member of the Johor State Legislative Assembly for Senggarang from 2004 to 2008. He was the first member of the Malaysian Islamic Party to be elected to the Johor Legislative Assembly.

Election result

References 

Members of the Johor State Legislative Assembly
21st-century Malaysian politicians
1951 births
Living people